USS LSM-236 was a LSM-1-class Landing Ship Medium of the United States Navy that saw active service in World War II and the Korean War.

Built by the Western Pipe and Steel Company, San Pedro, California, the ship was commissioned on 2 September 1944.

Service history
During World War II LSM-236 was assigned to the Asiatic-Pacific Theater, and following the war performed occupation duty in the Far East. Decommissioned on 15 July 1946 she was laid up in the Reserve Fleet.

LSM-236 was recommissioned on 8 September 1950 for service in the Korean War, and decommissioned on 17 October 1955 at Astoria, Oregon.

Laid up in the Pacific Reserve Fleet, Columbia River Group, Astoria, she was struck from the Naval Register, and transferred to the Philippines on 15 September 1960, serving as RPS Batanes (L-65). Batanes ran aground and declared a total loss in June 1971, and was scrapped in 1972.

Awards, citations and campaign ribbons
LSM-236 earned one battle star for Korean War service.

 American Campaign Medal 
 Asiatic-Pacific Campaign Medal
 World War II Victory Medal 
 Navy Occupation Service Medal (with Asia clasp) 
 National Defense Service Medal
 Korean Service Medal 
 United Nations Service Medal 
 Republic of Korea War Service Medal (retroactive)

References
 

World War II amphibious warfare vessels of the United States
Ships of the Philippine Navy
Ships transferred from the United States Navy to the Philippine Navy
LSM-1-class landing ships medium
1944 ships